Arjan Singh Mastana was well-known communist leader of Punjab. He was elected to the Punjab legislative assembly   from Valtoha constituency on the  Communist Party of India's election symbol. He was assassinated on 27 March 1986 by Khalistani terrorists.

See also
Achhar Singh Chhina
Baldev Singh Mann
Chanan Singh Dhoot
Darshan Singh Canadian
Deepak Dhawan
Gursharan Singh (theatre director)
Jaimal Singh Padda
Nidhan Singh Gudhan
Pash
Professor Ravinder Singh Ravi
Sarvan Singh Cheema
Sumeet Preetlari
Satyapal Dang
Teja Singh Swatantar
Punjab insurgency

References

Year of birth missing
1986 deaths
Assassinated Indian politicians
Communist Party of India politicians from Punjab, India
Members of the Punjab Legislative Assembly
Victims of Sikh terrorism